Adam Chatfield (born 22 June 1979) is a former Australian rules footballer who played with Carlton in the Australian Football League.

From the NSW/ACT Rams and having tested as the best sprinter in the 1997 AFL draft, Chatfield was drafted by Carlton with the No. 23 draft pick. He spent four years on the Carlton list, but managed only a single senior game before being delisted at the end of 2001. He was part of the Geelong reserves 2002 VFL premiership. Since 2003 he has played in the Victorian Amateur Football Association, first for Old Xaverians, then for Prahran/Assumption.

References

Sources
Holmesby, Russell & Main, Jim (2009). The Encyclopedia of AFL Footballers. 8th ed. Melbourne: Bas Publishing.

Adam Chatfield's profile at Blueseum

Carlton Football Club players
Living people
1979 births
Australian rules footballers from New South Wales
NSW/ACT Rams players
Pennant Hills Australian Football Club players
Old Xaverians Football Club players